Stellasteropsis is a genus of echinoderms belonging to the family Goniasteridae.

The species of this genus are found in Indian Ocean and Malesia.

Species:

Stellasteropsis colubrinus 
Stellasteropsis fouadi 
Stellasteropsis pharaonum 
Stellasteropsis tuberculiferus

References

Goniasteridae
Asteroidea genera